Arnaud Clément won in the final 6–3, 1–6, 6–3 against Fernando González.

Seeds

  Tommy Robredo (quarterfinals)
  Younes El Aynaoui (first round)
  Fernando González (final)
  Arnaud Clément (champion)
  Fabrice Santoro (semifinals)
  Dominik Hrbatý (first round)
  Antony Dupuis (first round)
  Hicham Arazi (second round)

Draw

Finals

Top half

Bottom half

References
 2003 Open de Moselle Draw

2003 Open de Moselle